The Consolidated Tape System (CTS) is the electronic service, introduced in April 1976, that provides last sale and trade data for issues admitted to dealings on the American Stock Exchange, New York Stock Exchange, and U.S. regional stock exchanges.

The Consolidated Tape Association (CTA) is the operating authority for both the Consolidated Quotation System (CQS) and the Consolidated Tape System (CTS).

See also
 Market data
 National market system plan
 Ticker tape

References

Financial markets
Self-regulatory organizations in the United States